Dance a Little Closer is a musical with a book and lyrics by Alan Jay Lerner and music by Charles Strouse. The story is an updated version of Robert E. Sherwood's 1936 antiwar comedy Idiot's Delight.

Plot overview
The musical is set on New Year's Eve "in the avoidable future" in the grand Alpine Barclay Palace Hotel, where the guests find themselves in the midst of a potential nuclear Armageddon. The characters are American singer Harry Aikens and Cynthia Brookfield-Bailey, who may have had a romantic fling years earlier. Among the others present are Cynthia's current paramour, Henry Kissinger-like diplomat Dr. Josef Winkler, a gay couple, a minister, and a freedom fighter.

Production
The musical opened on Broadway at the Minskoff Theatre on May 11, 1983, where it closed after one performance and 25 previews. Directed by Lerner and choreographed by Billy Wilson, the cast included Len Cariou, Noel Craig, Liz Robertson, George Rose, Don Chastain, Jeff Keller, Brent Barrett, and Alyson Reed. Show business insiders dubbed it "Dance a Little Faster...Close a Little Sooner."

In his New York Times review Frank Rich described it as "a huge, extravagant mishmash...that seems to have taken on a rampaging, self-destructive life of its own," a sentiment similar to those expressed by the other critics.

An original cast recording is available on CD.

Song list

Act I
It Never Would've Worked
Happy, Happy New Year
No Man Is Worth It
What Are You Going to Do About It?
A Woman Who Thinks I'm Wonderful
Pas de Deux
There's Never Been Anything Like Us
Another Life
Why Can't the World Go and Leave Us Alone?
He Always Comes Home to Me
I Got a New Girl
Dance a Little Closer
There's Always One You Can't Forget

Act II
Homesick
Mad
I Don't Know
Auf Wiedersehen
I Never Want to See You Again
On Top of the World
I Got a New Girl (Reprise)
Dance a Little Closer (Reprise)

References

External links
 
 Production, plot and songs at guidetomusicaltheatre.com

1983 musicals
Broadway musicals
Musicals based on plays
LGBT-related musicals
Musicals by Alan Jay Lerner
Musicals by Charles Strouse
New Year fiction
Plays set in Austria
Works set in hotels